The Gentbrugge Formation (abbreviation: Ge; named after the town of Gentbrugge in East Flanders) is a geologic formation in the west of Belgium. The formation crops out in East Flanders and West Flanders and also occurs in the subsurface of the Province of Antwerp. It consists of marine clay, silt and sand, deposited in the shallow sea that covered northern Belgium during the Ypresian age (around 50 million years ago, part of the early Eocene).

Description 
It is subdivided into three members. The base of the formation is formed by silty clay and clayey silt (Merelbeke Member). On top of this are laminae of silt (Pittem Member) and beds of very fine sand, disturbed by bioturbation (Vlierzele Member). The sands can have horizontal bedding as well as cross bedding, and are often lithified into sandstone.

Stratigraphy 
The Gentbrugge Formation is part of the Ieper Group and is stratigraphically on top of the older Mons-en-Pévèle Formation (micaceous sandstone), another formation of the same group. On top of the Gentbrugge Formation are deposits of the Lutetian Zenne Group. In the north of Belgium this is often the Aalter Formation (marine clays and sands). In the south the Aalter Formation often lacks and the younger Brussel Formation (marine sand and marl) and Lede Formation (marine calcareous sand) can be found directly on top of the Gentbrugge Formation.

See also 
 List of fossiliferous stratigraphic units in Belgium
 Ypresian formations
 Fur Formation of Denmark
 London Clay Formation of England
 Silveirinha Formation of Portugal
 Wasatchian formations
 Nanjemoy Formation of the eastern United States
 Wasatch Formation of the western United States
 Itaboraian formations
 Itaboraí Formation of Brazil
 Laguna del Hunco Formation of Argentina

References

Bibliography 

 
 
 

Geologic formations of Belgium
Eocene Series of Europe
Paleogene Belgium
Ypresian Stage
Sandstone formations
Siltstone formations
Shallow marine deposits
Formations
Formations
Formations